(Main list of acronyms)


 O – (i) Oberst – Observer – Obstacle – Octal –  Officer – Official – Oh – Operational –  Operator – Oprah (magazine) – Outstanding – (s) Oxygen

OA
 OA – (i) Operational Analysis – (i) Overeaters Anonymous
 OAC – (i) On Approved Credit
 OAP – Old Age Pensioner (UK)
 OAS – (i) Organization of American States
 OARSI – (i) Osteoarthritis Research Society International
 OASIS – (a) Objects and Agents for Information Systems and Simulation – Organization for the Advancement of Structured Information Standards
 OASIS – (a) Ontario Agencies Supporting Individuals with Special Needs
 OASIS – (a) Ontario Association of Sewage Industry Services
 OASP – (i) Operational Analysis Support Paper/Plan
 OAU – (i) Organization for African Unity

OB
 ob – (p) obiit (Latin, "(s) he died")
 OB
 (p) Obedience
 Obligation
 Obligatory
 Obsolete
 Obstetrics
 (i) Ocean Beach (California)
 Off Break (cricket)
 Old Bryanstonian
 Order of Battle
 Outlet Box (electrical)
 (p) Overbought (stock market)
 (i) Oversight Board
 OBE – (i) Officer of the Order of the British Empire
 OBJ
 (p) Objective (military parlance)
 (i) Odell Beckham Jr. (American football wide receiver)
 OBM – (p) Obsidian Black Metallic (automobile paint color)
 OBOR – (i) One Belt One Road, a former name of the China-sponsored Belt and Road Initiative
 OBS
 (p) Observation/Observer
 Obsolete
 Obstacle
 (i) Off Balance Sheet
 Optical Burst Switching (IEEE)
 Organic Brain Syndrome
 Organization(al) Breakdown Structure
 OBSS
 (i) Off Board Sensor Systems
 Ordo Byantinus Sancti Sepulchri (Byzantine Order of the Holy Sepulchre)
 Orbiter Boom Sensor System (space shuttle)
 Origins Billion Star Survey
 OBX – (p) Outer Banks (North Carolina)

OC
 oc – (s) Occitan language (ISO 639-1 code)
 OC – (i) Officer Commanding
 OCA – (i) Observatoire de la Côte d'Azur – Offensive Counter-Air
 OCD – (i) Obsessive-Compulsive Disorder
 OCFS – (i) Oracle Cluster File System
 OCFS  – (i) Office of Children & Family Services
 OCFS2 – (i) Oracle Cluster File System Release 2
 oci – (s) Occitan language (ISO 639-2 code)
 OCIDS – (i) Optical Combat Identification System
 OCMCC – (i)  Orchard County MCC
 OCONUS  Outside Continental United States
 OCN – (i) Oncology Certified Nurse
 OCO – (i) Oort Cloud Object
 OCOKA – (a) Observation, Cover and concealment, Obstacles, Key terrain, and Avenues of approach (mnemonic)
 OCR – (i) Optical Character Recognition
 OCS – see entry

OD
 OD
 (i) Old Dragon
 Ordnance Datum (nautical charts)
 (p) Overdose
 ODAS – (a) OCA-DLR Asteroid Survey
 ODB
 (i) Ol' Dirty Bastard (rapper)
 (i) One Dirty B*tch/Broad/Babe (professional wrestler)
 (i) Operational Data Base
 (i) Original David Baker (professional poker player; used to distinguish from another professional poker player of the same name)
 (i) Oxford Dictionary of Byzantium
 ODBC – (i) Open DataBase Connectivity
 ODI
 (i) Office for Disability Issues (UK government agency)
 One Day International (cricket)
 Open Data-Link Interface
 Oracle Data Integrator
 Overseas Development Institute (UK think tank)

OE
 OEA – (i) (U.S.) Office of Economic Adjustment
 OED – (i) Oxford English Dictionary
 OECD – (i) Organisation for Economic Co-operation and Development (international)
 OEG – (i) Operation Exposure Guidance
 OEIS - (i) On-Line Encyclopedia of Integer Sequences
 OEM – (i) Original Equipment Manufacturer

OF
 OFA – (i) Occipital Face Area
 OFDA – (i) U.S Agency for International Development's Office of Foreign Disaster Assistance

OG
 OG:
 Objective Glass, see Objective (optics)
 Obstetrics and gynaecology
 Offensive Guard, see Guard (American football)
 Old Giggleswickian, a former pupil of Giggleswick School
 Old Gower, a former pupil of University College School
 Old Gregorian, a former pupil of Downside School
 Old Greshamian, a former pupil of Gresham's School
 Old Gold, a dark yellow
 Olympic Games
 Original Gangster, see Gangster
 Original Gravity, see Gravity (beer)
 Outpost Gallifrey, a Doctor Who fansite.
 Own goal, in soccer, a goal scored by a player in their own side's goal
 OG: Optimized Gaia, theory the earth optimizes itself to promote life, and popular movement to Promote Human Progress in Harmony with the Natural World.
 OG: Original Gangster, an album by Ice-T
 OGC – (i) Open Geospatial Consortium
 OGD – (i) Other Government Department
 OGO – (i) Other Government Organization
  OGX – OUARGLA – a petroleum state in the south of Algeria

OH
 OH – (s) Ohio (postal symbol)
 OHC – (i) OverHead-Cam engine
 OHHLA – (a) Original Hip-Hop Lyrics Archive
 OHIP – (a) Ontario Health Insurance Plan
 OHMS – (i) On His (or Her Majesty's Service) (also written: O.H.M.S.)
 OHP – (i) Observatoire de Haute-Provence
 OHSS – (p) Ovarian Hyperstimulation Syndrome

OI
 OIC – (i) Officer In Charge
 OIE – (i) World Organisation for Animal Health (originally the Office international des épizooties, French for "International Epizootic Office")
 OIF – (i) Operation Iraqi Freedom
 OIOC – (i) Oriental & India Office Collections (in the British Library)

OJ
 oj – (s) Anishinaabe language (Ojibwa) (ISO 639-1 code)
 OJ – (i) Orange Juice – O. J. Simpson
 oji – (s) Anishinaabe language (Ojibwa) (ISO 639-2 code)
 OJT – On-the-Job Training

OK
 OK
 (s) Oklahoma (postal symbol)
 (i) oll korrect (facetious alteration of "all correct", 1839)
 OKC – (a) Oklahoma City

OL
 OLED – (a) Organic Light-Emitting Diode
 OLS – (i) Operational Linescan System

OM
 om – (s) Oromo language (ISO 639-1 code)
 OM – (s) Oman (ISO 3166 digram) – Olympique de Marseille (French football club)
 OMA – (i) Open Mobile Alliance – Operations & Maintenance, Army
 OMB – (i) U.S. Office of Management and Budget – Ontario Municipal Board – (i) Order of Mapungubwe in Bronze
 OMD – (i) Orchestral Manoeuvres in the Dark (1980s pop group)
 OME – (i) Osaka Mercantile Exchange
 OMFG – (i) Oh My F**king God
 OMG – (i) Oh My God or Or My Gosh
 OMGW – (i) "Oh My Gosh it's Windy"
 OMN – (s) Oman (ISO 3166 trigram)
 OMNCS – (i) U.S. Office of the Manager for the National Communications System
 OMP – (i) Order of Mapungubwe in Platinum
 OMR – (s) Omani rial (ISO 4217 currency code)
 OMS – (i) Order of Mapungubwe in Silver
 OMT – (i) Object Model Template
 OMW – (i) On My Way, Oh My Word

ON
 ON – (s) Ontario (postal symbol)
 Onna – Oniong, Nnung Ndem, and Awa, a Local Government Area in Nigeria
 ONC – (i) Orthopaedic Nurse Certified
 ONCE – (a) Organización Nacional de Ciegos Españoles (Spanish, "National Organization for the Spanish Blind")
 ONÉRA – (a) Office national d'études et de recherches aérospatiales (French, "Aeronautics and Space Research Center")
 ONG – (i) Orthodontic National Group
 ONH – (i) Óglaigh na hÉireann (Irish idiom for "soldiers of Ireland"), used for the following:
 Historically, as the Irish-language name for the original Irish Republican Army ("Old IRA")
 In modern times, as the Irish-language name of the Defence Forces of Ireland
 The name of two groups claiming descent from the Old IRA, one a currently inactive splinter group of the Continuity IRA and the other an active splinter group of the Real IRA
 ONI – (i) (U.S.) Office of Naval Intelligence
 ONS – (i) Operational Needs Statement

OO
 OO – (i) Object Oriented – Over & Out
 OOO – (i) Out Of the Office
 OOAD – (i) Object-Oriented Analysis and Design
 OOBE – (a) Out-of-body experience
 OOCL – (i) Orient Overseas Container Line
 OODA – (i) Observation, Orientation, Decision, Action loop (a.k.a. Boyd's Loop)
 OOMF – (i) One Of My Followers
 OOP – (i) Object-Oriented Programming – Out Of Print
 OOS – (i) Occupational Overuse Syndrome – OneSAF Objective System – Open Operating System – Out Of Service
 OOTW – (i) (Military) Operations Other Than War (MOOTW or OOTW)

OP
 OP
 (i) Observation Point/Post
 Ocean Pacific (surfwear and swimwear brand)
 Original Poster (internet)
 Order Point, in inventory management; the inventory state at which more items should be ordered. Often expressed as a part of OP/OQ (when quantity OP is reached, order OQ new items)
 Overpowered, often used to refer to fictional characters (e.g. Superman) or game mechanics (e.g. the Black Lotus in Magic: the Gathering) that are considered disproportionately strong
 OPA – (i) Other Procurement, Army
 OPAC – (a) Online Public Access Catalogue
 op cit – (p) opera citata (Latin, "in the work cited")
 OPCON – (p) Operational control
 OPCW – (i) Organisation for the Prohibition of Chemical Weapons
 OPEC – (a) Organization of the Petroleum Exporting Countries

 OpenStreetMap - (p) OpenStreetMap
 OPFOR – (p) Opposing force(s)
 OPI
 (i) Office of Primary Interest
 Open Prepress Interface
 OPINTEL – (p) Operational Intelligence
 OPLAN – (p) Operation plan (also OpPlan)
 OPORD – (p) Operation order
 OPP
 (i) Ontario Provincial Police
 Operational Planning Process
 Other People's Property/Pussy/Penis (song)
 OPS
 (i) On-base plus slugging (baseball statistics)
 (p) Operations
 OPSEC
 (p) Operations security
 Open Platform for Security
 OPSI
 (a) Overwhelming post splenectomy infection
 UK Office of Public Sector Information
 OPTAR – (p) Operational target
 OPV – (i) Offshore Patrol Vessel

OQ
 OQ - (i) Order Quantity, in inventory management; the quantity of new items to be ordered. Often expressed as a part of OP/OQ (when quantity OP is reached, order OQ new items)

OR
 or – (s) Oriya language (ISO 639-1 code)
 OR – (i) Operating Room (surgery) – Operational/Operations Research – (s) Oregon (postal symbol) - overreciprocation - when the leader of an inner circle friendship contacts a friend more than is wanted or reasonable 
 ORAU – (a/i) Oak Ridge Associated Universities
 ORB – (a/i) Object Request Broker
 ORBAT – (p) Order of Battle
 ORD – (i) O'Hare International Airport in Chicago, Illinois (IATA Airport Code ORD)
 ORD – (i) Office of Research and Development – Operational Requirements Document
 ORF – (i) Operational Readiness Float
 ori – (s) Oriya language (ISO 639-2 code)
 ORISE – (a) Oak Ridge Institute for Science and Education
 orm – (s) Oromo language (ISO 639-2 code)
 ORNL – (i) Oak Ridge National Laboratory
 ORR – (i) Oak Ridge Reservation (U.S. DOE) – Office of Rail Regulation (UK government) –  Office of Refugee Resettlement – (CIA) Office of Research and Reports – Operational Readiness Rate – Operational Readiness Review
 ORSA – Oxacillin-resistant Staphylococcus aureus – Operations Research Society of America

OS
 OS – (s) Operating System
 os – (s) Ossetic language (ISO 639-1 code)
 Os – (s) Osmium
 OSA – (i) Order of St. Augustine
 OSCE – (i) Organization for Security and Co-operation in Europe
 OSD – (i) U.S. Office of the Secretary of Defense – (i) On-screen Display
 OSDL – (i) Open Source Development Labs
 OSE – (a) Own Separate Entrance
 OSERS – (a) U.S. Department of Education Office of Special Education and Rehabilitative Services
 OSETI – (a) Optical SETI also Optical SETI

 OSGeo - (a) Open Source Geospatial Foundation (OSGeo)
 OSHA – (a) Occupational Safety and Health Administration
 OSI –  (i) Office of Strategic Influence – Ontario Swine Improvement – Open Source Initiative – Open Systems Interconnection
 OSIA – (i) (U.S.) On-Site Inspection Agency
 OSL – (i) Open Source License – Optically Stimulated Luminescence – Orbiting Solar Laboratory
 OSIRIS
 (a) Optical, Spectroscopic, and Infrared Remote Imaging System (astronomical system on the Rosetta spacecraft)
 Optical System for Imaging and low Resolution Integrated Spectroscopy (astronomical system on the land-based Gran Telescopio Canarias)
 OSM – (i) One Saturday Morning
 OSMF - (a) OpenStreetMap Foundation
 OSPA – (a) Operations Security Professional's Association site of OSPA

 OSPA – (i) Oregon School Psychologists Association 
 OSRH – (i) Oružane Snage Republike Hrvatske (en: Armed forces of the Republic of Croatia)
 oss – (s) Ossetic language (ISO 639-2 code)
 OSS – (i) Office of Strategic Services (1942–1945, forerunner of CIA)
 OSU – (i) Ohio State University – Oklahoma State University

OT
 OTA – Occupational Therapy Assistant, (i) Office of Technology Assessment – (a/i) Orthodontic Technicians Association
 OTAC – (i) Orthodontic Technicians Association Conference – (i) Orthodontic Technicians Association Council
 OTB – (i) Off The Ball – (i) Offtrack Betting – (p) OneSAF Testbed (a descendant of ModSAF)
 OTC – (i) Over-The-Counter (drugs)
 OTD – (i) Off the derech (referring to an Orthodox Jew who has stopped practicing the tenets of his or her faith)
 OTEA – (i) (U.S. Army) Operational Test Evaluation Agency
 OTI – (i) Office of Transition Initiatives (United States Agency for International Development)
 OTO – (i) Ordo Templi Orientis (Latin, "Order of the Temple of the East", i.e. the Order of Oriental Templars)
 OTOH – (i) On The Other Hand
 OTS – Off the scale, sexually untouchable except for a lot of money.
 OTSBH – (i) Over The Shoulder Boulder Holder
 OTW – (i) On The Way
 OTYBL – (i) Over To You Blue Leader
 OTYRL – (i) Over To You Red Leader

OU
 OU – (p) University of Oklahoma

OV
 OVC
 (s) Overcast (METAR Code)
 (i) Ohio Valley Conference
 OVV – (i) Optically Visually Violent, or Optically Violently Variable – a type of quasar

OW
 OW – (i) Old Wykehamist
 OWN – (i) Oprah Winfrey Network

OX
OX – (p) IATA code for Orient Thai Airlines
OXC – (p) Optical cross-connect
OXF – (p) IATA code for London Oxford Airport
Oxfam – (p) Oxford Committee for Famine Relief (international poverty relief organization)
OXM – (i) Official Xbox Magazine
OXR – (p) IATA code for Oxnard Airport
OXT – (s) Oxytocin

OY
 Oy – (p) Osakeyhtiö (Finnish, "stock company")
 Oyj – (p) Julkinen osakeyhtiö (Finnish, "public stock company")

OZ
 OZ – Ounce

Acronyms O